The 2012 Redditch Borough Council election for the Redditch Borough Council was held on 3 May 2012. All Council wards, apart from Abbey, Astwood Bank & Feckenham, and Crabbs Cross & Rural wards, voted in the local elections. In the Church Hill ward, two councillors were up for election, due to a by-election which was called after the death of Labour councillor Robin King, who died in February 2012.

Election results

All parties received fewer votes compared to 2011. This is probably due to low turnouts across Redditch and because Astwood Bank & Feckenham ward and Crabbs Cross & Rural Ward were not voting. These wards normally have higher than average turnouts.

Ward Results

Batchley and Brockhill Ward

Central Ward

Church Hill Ward

Greenlands Ward

Headless Cross & Oakenshaw Ward

Lodge Park Ward

Matchborough Ward

West Ward

Winyates Ward

2012 English local elections
2012
2010s in Worcestershire